Nordhaus is a surname. Notable people with the surname include:

 William Nordhaus (born 1941), American economist
 Ted Nordhaus (born 1966), American environmentalist
 Victor Heck (born 1967), American horror author, pseudonym for David Nordhaus

German-language surnames